Münchner Marionettentheater is a theatre in Munich, Bavaria, Germany. It is known as the oldest, not-mobil puppetry in the German-speaking countries. It is chaired by puppeteer Siegfried Böhmke since 2000.

External links 
 Website of the Münchner Marionettentheater (german)

Theatres in Munich
Puppet theaters
Puppetry in Germany